Scredington is a village and civil parish in the North Kesteven district of Lincolnshire, England.

The population of the civil parish at the 2011 census was 283.

Scredington church, on Church Lane, is dedicated to Saint Andrew.

See also 
 Aswarby and Scredington railway station

References

External links 

"Scredington (Scredlington)", Genuki. Retrieved 21 May 2012
"Scredington"; Ancestry.com. Retrieved 21 May 2012
"Scredington Lincolnshire"; A Vision of Britain through Time. Retrieved 21 May 2012
"Listed Buildings in Scredington, Lincolnshire, England; British Listed Buildings. Retrieved 21 May 2012

North Kesteven District
Villages in Lincolnshire
Civil parishes in Lincolnshire